The following is a list of numbered roads in the Regional Municipality of Waterloo, Ontario. Numbered roads are maintained by the Waterloo Region Transportation Department.

King's Highways 
The following is a list of provincially maintained highways in Waterloo Region. Communities are ordered by where the route encounters them (either from south to north or from west to east).

Regional roads

References